X-inefficiency is the divergence of a firm’s observed behavior in practice, influenced by a lack of competitive pressure, from efficient behavior assumed or implied by economic theory. The concept of X-inefficiency was introduced by Harvey Leibenstein.

X-Inefficiency is introduced in 1966 by the professor of Harvard University, Harvey Leibenstein's publication in the American Economic Review, named "Allocative efficiency vs. X efficiency". X-Inefficiency refer to the firm's production that fails to make full use of its resources, resulting reaches to the maximum possible level of output given the existing resources and environment, namely the efficiency frontier.

X-inefficiency pin out irrational actions performed by firms in the market.

Overview
The difference between the actual and minimum cost of production for a given output produces X-inefficiency.

Companies will incur X-Inefficiency as a result of lack of motivation to control its costs, which brings the average cost of production exceeds costs actually required for production. For example, the company have a potential potential cost curve. However, due to the lack incentive to motivate on control costs, the company's actual cost curve is at a higher position compared to the potential cost curve.

The phenomenon of X-inefficiency is in relation to the allocation of effort, especially the managerial effort.

Mainstream economic theory tends to assume that the management of firms act to maximize profit by minimizing the inputs used to produce a given level of output.

Competition energizes firms to seek productive efficiency gains and produce at lowest unit costs or risk losing sales to more efficient rivals. With market forms other than perfect competition, such as monopoly, productive inefficiency can persist, because the lack of competition makes it possible to use inefficient production techniques and still stay in business. In addition to monopoly, sociologists have identified a number of ways in which markets may be organizationally embedded, and thus may depart in behavior from economic theory.

Organizational slack occurs when firms opt to employ more resources than are needed to produce a given level of output. Unused capacity results in X-inefficiency. Organizational slack can be explained by the principal-agent problem. In companies ownership and management are separate. Shareholders (the principal) elect directors (the agent) to act on their behalf and maximize shareholder value. Managers may take decisions that maximize their own and not shareholder objectives e.g. hiring extra staff to reduce manager workloads. This increases unit costs.

X-inefficiency only looks at the outputs that are produced with given inputs. It doesn't take account of whether the inputs are the best ones to be using, or whether the outputs are the best ones to be producing. For example, a firm that employs brain surgeons to dig ditches might still be X-efficient, even though reallocating the brain surgeons to curing the sick would be more efficient for society overall. In this sense, X-inefficiency focuses on productive efficiency and minimising costs rather than allocative efficiency and maximising welfare. For more extensive discussions, see Sickles and Zelenyuk (2019, p. 1-8, 469) and references therein.

Arguments about X-Inefficiency 
Based on the assumption that the non-trade output of the firm is zero, Leibenstein argues that the X-inefficiency results from the lack of motivation of the resource owners to produce less than the maximum technical output of the trade goods. Leibenstein also argued that sometimes firms are not maximising their profits because there may be a certain level of efficiency, considering the human element which introduced by Leibenstein

Causes to X-Inefficiency 
Through the study on two monopoly companies IBM and Xerox about X-inefficiency, Emily Nowlan stated four possible causes of X-inefficiency which led companies to decline. First, the company did not predict market trends before making decision and implementing actions. Second, the mismanagement of innovation and the waste of opportunities. Companies' negative behaviors when facing regulatory barriers are also the cause of X-inefficiency. Ultimately, wasting resources looking for new markets will also induce X-inefficiency and lead to the decline of companies.

Examples

Monopoly
A monopoly is a price maker in that its choice of output level affects the price paid by consumers. Consequently, a monopoly tends to price at a point where price is greater than long-run average costs. X-inefficiency, however tends to increase average costs causing further divergence from the economically efficient outcome. The sources of X-inefficiency have been ascribed to things such as overinvestment and empire building by managers, lack of motivation stemming from a lack of competition, and pressure by labor unions to pay above-market wages.

Suggested by Bergsman, The sum of X-inefficiency and monopoly returns is much larger than costs of mis-allocation.

In reality, industries with strong monopoly capacity will be more restricted by legal regulations. These regulations can impose competitive pressure on companies and prevent the industry turning into a true monopoly. Meanwhile, these artificial pressure of regulations can induce competitive pressure to companies, thus improving X-inefficiency.

See also 
Inefficiency
Government failure
Government waste
Pareto efficiency
Productive efficiency

References 

Economic efficiency
Monopoly (economics)